Ian Lindsay Tuxworth (18 June 1942 – 21 January 2020) was an Australian politician, who was Chief Minister of the Northern Territory of Australia from 17 October 1984 until his resignation on 10 May 1986.

Early life
Tuxworth was born on 18 June 1942 in Wollongong, New South Wales, to Lindsay and historian Hilda Elsie Tuxworth, and moved with his family to Tennant Creek in 1951. He was educated at Tennant Creek Primary School, and Rostrevor College in Adelaide.

Before entering politics, Tuxworth, also known affectionately as "Slim", with his father and brother Robert (Bob), started a soft drink factory in Tennant Creek called Crystal Waters, which was later sold to the Coca-Cola Company. Tuxworth also played baseball and was a member of the 1975 North Australian Kiewaldt team.

Member of the Legislative Assembly

|}
Tuxworth was elected as the Country Liberal Party (CLP) member for the electoral division of Barkly (which included Tennant Creek), in the Northern Territory Legislative Assembly at its inaugural election in 1974. As the representative for Barkly, Tuxworth was instrumental in facilitating the government support for the construction of the Mary Ann Dam north of the town of Tennant Creek.

Following the resignation of Paul Everingham, Tuxworth was elected Chief Minister on 17 October 1984. In 1985, he opposed the federal government's move to transfer ownership of Uluru to its traditional owners, the Aṉangu people, however 30 years later he acknowledged the handback had been a success. He resigned as Chief Minister and from the CLP on 10 May 1986 to form the NT Nationals party At the 1987 election Tuxworth was elected as the NT Nationals member for Barkly by 19 votes. His victory was annulled by the Court of Disputed Returns after a successful challenge from losing independent candidate Maggie Hickey. On 5 September 1987, he won a by-election, again defeating Hickey, who was now representing the Labor Party (ALP). After a redistribution turned Barkly into a nominally Labor-held seat, Tuxworth stood unsuccessfully for the seat of Goyder at the 1990 election.

Tuxworth became the first CLP leader who did not lead the party to an election.

After politics
Following his defeat, Tuxworth moved to Perth, Western Australia, where he died on 21 January 2020, aged 77. He was survived by his wife Ruth, children Sonia, Guy and Gemma, and eight grandchildren.

References

|-

1942 births
2020 deaths
People educated at Rostrevor College
Chief Ministers of the Northern Territory
Country Liberal Party members of the Northern Territory Legislative Assembly
Members of the Northern Territory Legislative Assembly
Treasurers of the Northern Territory
Recipients of the Centenary Medal
Northern Territory Nationals members of the Northern Territory Legislative Assembly